The Jewess of Toledo (German: Die Jüdin von Toledo) is a 1919 Austrian silent historical drama film directed by Otto Kreisler and starring Franz Höbling, Ida Norden and Thea Rosenquist. It is an adaptation of the 1872 play The Jewess of Toledo by Franz Grillparzer which was based on the relationship between Alfonso VIII of Castile and Rahel la Fermosa in 12th century Spain.

Cast
Franz Höbling as Alfonso VIII of Castile 
Ida Norden as Eleanor of England, Queen of Castile 
Leopold Iwald as Count Manrique de Lara 
Josef Viktora as Garzarrah
Theodor Weiß as Isaak
Emmy Flemmich as Esther 
Thea Rosenquist as Rahel

References

External links

1910s historical drama films
Austrian silent feature films
Austrian historical drama films
Films directed by Otto Kreisler
Austrian films based on plays
Films set in the 12th century
Films set in Toledo, Spain
Films based on works by Franz Grillparzer
Austrian black-and-white films
Jews and Judaism in Toledo, Spain
1919 drama films
Silent historical drama films
1910s German-language films